The U.S. state of Florida, due to being a peninsula and its proximity to the Gulf of Mexico and Atlantic Ocean, has many bridges of varying lengths. The longest bridge in the state is the Seven Mile Bridge located in the Florida Keys. This list includes overwater automobile bridges  or longer.

Main list

Gallery

See also
List of bridges on the National Register of Historic Places in Florida
List of movable bridges in Florida
List of crossings of the St. Johns River
List of bridges in the United States

Notes

References

McGovern, Bernie (ed.). Florida Almanac 2007-2008. Pelican: 2007, p. 292.

 
Florida
Bridges
Bridges